Alex Rodriguez (born 15 October 1980) is an Andorran football player. He has played for Andorra national team and Santa Coloma.

National team statistics
Updated 28 September 2014

References

External links
Andorra - Record International Players

1980 births
Living people
Andorran footballers
Andorra international footballers
FC Santa Coloma players
Association football defenders